DiLorenzo is a surname. Notable people with the surname include:

 Francis X. DiLorenzo (1942–2017), American Roman Catholic bishop 
 Daniel DiLorenzo, medical device entrepreneur and physician-scientist 
 Thomas DiLorenzo, American economics professor
 Vincent Dilorenzo (1911–1989), English rugby league footballer who played in the 1930s and 1940s, and rugby union footballer who played in the 1940s
 Danielle DiLorenzo, a contestant of the American reality television show Survivor
 Laura DiLorenzo, co-protagonist of the 2007 homemade music video Chongalicious